Cihadiye can refer to:

 Cihadiye, Biga
 Cihadiye, Kargı
 Cihadiye, Sarıçam
 Cihadiye, Yenişehir